Hydrangea hydrangeoides, the Japanese hydrangea vine, is a species of flowering plant in the family Hydrangeaceae, native to Ulleungdo Island of South Korea, Japan, and the southern Kuril Islands.

Etymology
The specific epithet hydrangeoides means "resembling Hydrangea" or "like a Hydrangea". This may appear strange considering the current position of this taxon within the genus Hydrangea. However, it was first described as a member of the genus Schizophragma and the specific epithet was chosen to express a morphological similarity to the previously separate genus Hydrangea.

Horticulture
Under its synonym Schizophragma hydrangeoides its cultivars 'Roseum' and 'Moonlight' have gained the Royal Horticultural Society's Award of Garden Merit.

In cultivation this species is slow to establish.

References

hydrangeoides
Flora of South Korea
Flora of Japan
Flora of the Kuril Islands
Plants described in 2014